Gabriela Perianu (born 20 June 1994) is a Romanian handballer for CSM București and the Romanian national team.

Achievements
Liga Naţională:
Silver Medalist: 2016, 2017
Bronze Medalist: 2014
Cupa României: 
Bronze Medalist: 2016  
Supercupa României:
Winner: 2015
Nemzeti Bajnokság I:
Bronze Medalist: 2019 
EHF Cup:
Winner: 2019
World Championship:
Bronze Medalist: 2015
World University Championship:
Silver Medalist: 2016

Awards and recognition
 All-Star Left Back of the World Youth Championship: 2012
 All-Star Left Back of the European Youth Championship: 2011
Brăila County Sportswoman of the Year: 2011
 Best Defender of the Bucharest Trophy: 2015

References

External links

1994 births
Living people
Sportspeople from Brăila
Romanian female handball players 
Handball players at the 2016 Summer Olympics
Olympic handball players of Romania
CS Minaur Baia Mare (women's handball) players
Siófok KC players
Expatriate handball players
Romanian expatriate sportspeople in Hungary